Podu Turcului is a commune in Bacău County, Western Moldavia, Romania. It is composed of ten villages: Bălănești, Căbești, Fichitești, Giurgioana, Hanța, Lehancea, Plopu, Podu Turcului, Răcușana and Sârbi.

Natives
 Crina Ailincăi-Pintea, female handball player
 Lucian Vasilache, male handball player

References

Communes in Bacău County
Localities in Western Moldavia